Henryetta Edwards (1 January 1926 – 1 May 2021) was a British actress on the London stage, and in films and television, mostly in the 1940s and 1950s.

Early life 
Edwards was born in Chertsey, Surrey, the daughter of actors Henry Edwards and Chrissie White.

Career 
London stage roles for Edwards included parts in George Bernard Shaw's Pygmalion (1947), I Remember Mama (1948), Terrence Rattigan's The Browning Version and Harlequinade (original casts, 1948–1949), An Angel of No Importance (1949), The Trial (1950), Treasure Hunt (1950), The Attenborough Home (1953), Murder Story (1954), and Sailor Beware! (1955–1958).

Edwards appeared in the films Squibs (1935, directed by her father), She Shall Have Murder (1950), and The Feminine Touch (1956, a hospital drama from Ealing Studios; marketed as The Gentle Touch in the United States, and A Lamp is Heavy in Canada). She had roles in television adaptations of Lady from Edinburgh (1948), The Browning Version (1949), Harlequinade (1953), and Sailor Beware! (1956); she also appeared in "The Invisible Knife", an episode of the Boris Karloff series Colonel March of Scotland Yard (1955).

Personal life 
Edwards died in 2021, aged 95, in England. She never married.

References

External links 
 
 
 "Personality: Meet Henry Edwards and Chrissie White" (1946), a British Pathé newsreel profile of Henryetta Edwards and her parents

1926 births
2021 deaths
British actresses
People from Chertsey